Jeremy Christian Nicholas Horder  (born 25 February 1962) is Professor of Criminal Law and former Head of Department at the London School of Economics and Political Science. From 2005 - 2010 he served as Law Commissioner for England and Wales.
Horder graduated from the University of Hull in 1984 with an LLB. He then studied Civil Law at the University of Oxford, completing his DPhil while a Fellow of Jesus College. His thesis concerned homicide law from the 16th to the 20th Centuries. Horder was the Chairman of Oxford's Faculty of Law between 1998 and 2000. He is an Honorary Bencher of Middle Temple and former Edmund Davies Professor of Criminal Law at King's College London. He holds an Honorary LLD from the University of Hull. In 2014 he was elected a Fellow of the British Academy, the United Kingdom's national academy for the humanities and social sciences.

References 
HORDER, Prof. Jeremy Christian Nicholas, Who's Who 2015, A & C Black, 2015; online edn, Oxford University Press, 2014

1962 births
Living people
British legal scholars
People educated at Felsted School
Alumni of Keble College, Oxford
Academics of the London School of Economics
Academics of King's College London
Alumni of the University of Hull
Legal scholars of the University of Oxford
Fellows of the British Academy
Fellows of Worcester College, Oxford